Onofrio Montesoro or Onuphrio Montesoro (8 June 1647 – 24 December 1722) was a Roman Catholic prelate who served as Bishop of Castellaneta (1696–1722).

Biography
Onofrio Montesoro was born in Bari, Italy. He was ordained a deacon on 2 February 1689 and ordained a priest on 6 February 1689. On 17 December 1696, he was appointed during the papacy of Pope Innocent XII as Bishop of Castellaneta. On 21 December 1696, he was consecrated bishop by Sebastiano Antonio Tanara, Cardinal-Priest of Santi Quattro Coronati, with Prospero Bottini, Titular Archbishop of Myra, and Giorgio Spínola, Bishop of Albenga, serving as co-consecrators. He served as Bishop of Castellaneta until his death on 24 December 1722.

References

External links and additional sources
 (for Chronology of Bishops) 
 (for Chronology of Bishops) 

17th-century Italian Roman Catholic bishops
18th-century Italian Roman Catholic bishops
Bishops appointed by Pope Innocent XII
1647 births
1722 deaths